Charles Arthur Stanbridge (9 January 1899 – 13 February 1971) was an Australian rules footballer who played with South Melbourne in the VFL during the 1920s.

Family
The son of Arthur Ernest Stanbridge (1872–1941), and Edith Emily Stanbridge (1871–1904), née Cockery, Charles Arthur Stanbridge was born in Preston, Victoria on 9 January 1899.

He married Elizabeth Ann Robinson (1899–1968) in 1920.

Military service 
With his father's formal permission, he enlisted in the First AIF in July 1917.

Football

Williamstown (VFA)
Stanbridge began his senior career in the Victorian Football Association at Williamstown in 1921, where he was a member of the club's premiership team.

Port Melbourne (VFA)
He crossed to Port Melbourne for the following three seasons, winning a premiership with the club in 1922.

South Melbourne (VFL)
He joined VFL club South Melbourne in 1925, where he played for five seasons, winning South's best and fairest award in 1928 and being appointed captain for the 1929 season. Stanbridge also represented Victoria in interstate football, appearing seven times.

Williamstown (VFA)
He returned to Williamstown, and won a Recorder Cup and VFA Medal during his time with the club, which he coached in 1933.

Camberwell (VFA)
Stanbridge played a practice match with Camberwell and applied for a clearance from williamstown in early 1934, but started the season with Williamstown, before crossing over to play with Camberwell in late June, 1934. Ended up playing six games in 1934.

South Melbourne Districts
Stanbridge was appointed as coach in 1935.

Death
He died in Blackburn South, Victoria on 13 February 1971.

Footnotes

References
 "Punched Unconscious": Baker Fined for Assault, The Argus, (Saturday, 17 January 1925), p.29.
 World War One Nominal Roll: Private Charles Arthur Stanbridge (6901), Australian War Memorial.
 World War One Service Record: Private Charles Arthur Stanbridge (6901), National Archives of Australia.

External links

 Charlie Stanbridge: Boyles Football Photos. 
 Stanbridge, Charlie, The VFA Project.

1899 births
1971 deaths
Australian rules footballers from Melbourne
Australian Rules footballers: place kick exponents
Sydney Swans players
Port Melbourne Football Club players
Port Melbourne Football Club coaches
Williamstown Football Club players
Williamstown Football Club coaches
Camberwell Football Club players
Bob Skilton Medal winners
Australian military personnel of World War I
People from Preston, Victoria
Military personnel from Melbourne